Yazmín Colette Torrealba Valenzuela (born 28 May 1992) is a Chilean footballer who plays as a forward for Universidad Católica and the Chile women's national team.

International career
Torrealba made her senior debut for Chile on 29 August 2019 in a 1–0 friendly win against Costa Rica.

Personal life
Torrealba has a son.

References 

1992 births
Living people
Women's association football forwards
Chilean women's footballers
Chile women's international footballers
Club Deportivo Universidad Católica footballers
Santiago Morning footballers
Universidad de Chile footballers
Club Deportivo Palestino (women) players